Ján Zvara (born 12 February 1963 in Banská Bystrica) is a retired Slovak high jumper who represented Czechoslovakia. His greatest achievement was the bronze medal at the 1987 IAAF World Indoor Championships. His personal best was 2.36 metres, achieved in August 1987 in Prague.

International competitions

External links

1963 births
Living people
Czechoslovak male high jumpers
Slovak male high jumpers
Sportspeople from Banská Bystrica
Place of birth missing (living people)
World Athletics Indoor Championships medalists
Competitors at the 1986 Goodwill Games